Staraya Pokrovka may refer to:

Staraya Pokrovka, Osh, a village in Osh Region, Kyrgyzstan
the former name of Chuy, Kyrgyzstan, a village in Chuy Region, Kyrgyzstan